"I Believe in Everything" is a song by John Entwistle. "I Believe in Everything" was released as a single in 1971. The B-side was "My Size". The song also appears on Entwistle's debut solo album, Smash Your Head Against the Wall. When Entwistle was asked about the song in comparison to the rest of the album, he said:

I've been saying a lot of stuff that I didn't really believe in. I sort of wrote it for the heads, really, the people thinking, "ah, so that's where Entwistle's brain's at, he really sort of believes in the devil and hell and all that sort of business." So I wrote a number that touches on reincarnation, then goes into the absurd, with Father Christmas and the whole bit and right at the end just to prevent the heads from thinking that I did believe in everything like I was saying, 'cause they always seem to believe that you actually believe in your own words. I believe in some of them but not all of them, so I just wrote the joke in to throw them off, and it's done it.

The song ends with a chorus of "Rudolph the Red-Nosed Reindeer".

Personnel
John Entwistle – vocals, bass
Dave "Cyrano" Langston – guitar
Jerry Shirley – drums
Keith Moon – backing vocals

References

The Who songs
1971 songs
Songs written by John Entwistle
Track Records singles